The Hugh H. Brown House, near Tonopah, Nevada, United States, is a large adobe house that was built in 1906.  It was listed on the National Register of Historic Places in 1982.  It was deemed significant for its association with Tonopah attorney Hugh H. Brown.

References 

Houses in Nye County, Nevada
Tonopah, Nevada
Houses completed in 1906
Houses on the National Register of Historic Places in Nevada
National Register of Historic Places in Nye County, Nevada
1906 establishments in Nevada